The 2014–15 Butler Bulldogs women's basketball team will represent Butler University in the 2014–15 college basketball season. The Bulldogs will be led by new head coach Kurt Godlevske and are members of the Big East Conference. The Bulldogs will play their home games at the Hinkle Fieldhouse. They finished the season 14–16, 10–8 in Big East play to finish in a tie fifth place. They lost in the quarterfinals in the Big East women's tournament to St. John's.

Roster

Schedule

|-
!colspan=9 style="background:#13294B; color:#FFFFFF;"| Exhibition

|-
!colspan=9 style="background:#13294B; color:#FFFFFF;"| Non-Conference Regular Season

|-
!colspan=9 style="background:#13294B; color:#FFFFFF;"| Big East Conference Play

|-
!colspan=9 style="background:#13294B; color:#FFFFFF;"| Big East tournament

References

Butler
Butler Bulldogs women's basketball seasons
Butler Bulldogs women's basketball
Butler Bulldogs women's basketball
2014 in sports
2015 in sports